Guy Jodoin (born 1966 in Sherbrooke, Quebec) is a Quebec comedian. He is best known as Capitaine Charles Patenaude in Dans une galaxie près de chez vous and Sucré Salé.

In 2020 he appeared in Escouade 99, the Quebec television adaptation of Brooklyn Nine-Nine. In 2022 he played the role of Victor-Hugo Lamothe in the film Niagara.

References

External links

French Quebecers
Living people
People from Sherbrooke
Comedians from Quebec
1966 births
Canadian male film actors
Canadian male television actors
20th-century Canadian comedians
21st-century Canadian comedians
20th-century Canadian male actors
21st-century Canadian male actors
Canadian male comedians